Lamprostola thermeola is a moth of the subfamily Arctiinae. It was described by Paul Dognin in 1912. There are no photos of it available currently to show how this species of moth looks like. It is found in Colombia.

References

 Natural History Museum Lepidoptera generic names catalog

Lithosiini
Moths described in 1912